Edmund Dominic Hester (born 23 August 1967) is an English educator and former first-class cricketer.

Hester was born at Radcliffe in August 1967. He was educated at Thornleigh Salesian College, before going up to Brasenose College, Oxford. While studying at Oxford, he played first-class cricket for Oxford University in 1989, making five appearances. Playing as a left-arm medium pace bowler, he took 11 wickets at an average of 52.00 and with best figures of 4 for 100. After graduating from Oxford, he became a schoolteacher. He is the current headmaster of Princethorpe College.

References

External links

1967 births
Living people
People from Radcliffe, Greater Manchester
People educated at Thornleigh Salesian College
Alumni of Brasenose College, Oxford
English cricketers
Oxford University cricketers
Schoolteachers from Warwickshire
Heads of schools in England